Rokeri s Moravu (meaning Rockers from Morava) was a Serbian band active from 1977-1991 and again from 2006-2008. Their music was a mix of Serbian folk music with rock elements and the lyrics in folksy dialect of Šumadija and Morava Valley, combined with numerous popular culture references. Their visual trademark were Serbian šajkača caps and opanci shoes, worn either with traditional dress and/or in crazy combinations with tuxedos, fur coats or A-shirts.

The band was formed in 1977 by Boris Bizetić, who wrote, composed and made musical arrangements for all Rokeri s Moravu's songs (more than 220) and who is also one of the lead singers of the band. The other lead singer was Zvonko Milenković. Two additional singers were Branislav Anđelović (who was also a guitar player) and Branko Janković. Branko Janković died in 1982 after a car accident. Branislav Anđelović left the band in 1988.

Rokeri recorded 17 studio albums from 1977 to 1991, when they stopped recording but continued having occasional live performances around Europe. Between 1988 and 1991 Rokeri released five VHS programs. During the 1990s they were active on television in several TV shows. The best-selling album was Krkenzi kikiriki from 1980. Their greatest hits include Turio Ljubiša pivo da se 'ladi, Ja Tarzan a ti Džejn, Stojadinka ovce šiša, Seks na eks... In 2005, 3 "best of" box sets of 2CDs each, titled Sabrana nedela (Collected misdeeds) was released. The following year their first DVD, with 30 previously unreleased music videos, came out. A comeback album, "Projekat", was released in 2007, recorded only by Boris Bizetić and Zvonko Milenković, with guest appearances by famous folk singers Predrag Cune Gojković, Predrag Živković Tozovac and Lepa Lukić. This album was followed by DVD with 20 music videos that same year.

Zvonko Milenković died in September 2008.

Discography

Quotes

References

 Official site of Boris Bizetić, containing full discography of Rokeri s Moravu (Serbian)

Yugoslav musical groups
Musical groups established in 1977
Musical groups disestablished in 1991
Serbian musical groups